Drogo de la Bouerer (also recorded as Drogo of la Beuvrière, Drogo de la Bouerer.) was a Flemish associate of William the Conqueror, who was rewarded after the conquest with a large grant of land in northern and eastern England, primarily in Holderness, where he built Skipsea Castle.

After the unexplained death of his wife Drogo fled England, supposedly for Flanders, and disappears from history. His land in England subsequently became the property of Odo, Count of Champagne.

Biography
Much of what is known about Drogo de la Bouerer is known from the Domesday Book and chronicles of Fountains Abbey and of Meaux Abbey.

According to the Domesday record after the conquest Drogo held lands in and was lord of all of Holderness, holding dozens of manors there; he also held land in Lincolnshire and was lord of Castle Bytham, Little Bytham, Anwick, Ruskington, Carlton-le-Moorland, Barrow-upon-Humber, Goxhill, and Great Limber; in Norfolk he was lord of Saxlingham, Bessingham, North Barningham, Hindringham, Burgh-next-Aylsham, Erpingham, and Gissing as well having other possessions there; he was lord of Chadstone, Northamptonshire; and lord of Oakley, Suffolk, and also had land in Sotherton, Suffolk; and in Cold Overton, and Hoby, Leicestershire. Drogo acquired his lands primary from the holdings of Morcar of Northumbria, also from Ulf son of Tope.

The Cistercian writers give very similar accounts. In the Chronica Monasterii de Melsa (Chronicles of Meaux Abbey), Drogo is said to have been from Flanders. - he was rewarded by William of Normandy after the conquest with the Ilse of Holderness, and was the builder of Skipsea Castle.

Drogo poisoned his own wife, possibly by accident, after which he visited the King asking permission to return to Flanders, and borrowed money from him, and then left the country by sea. According to William Camden his wife was the King's niece, and he killed her by poisoning.

On discovering the lie King William sent for Drogo to be arrested, but he was never caught, and subsequently Drogo's possessions in Holderness were passed to Odo, Count of Champagne. Odo became Lord of Holderness sometime before September 1087.

Notes

References

Sources

Holderness
Norman conquest of England
History of the East Riding of Yorkshire
People from the county of Flanders
11th-century English people